Elgin Street is located in Central, Hong Kong. It was named after James Bruce, 8th Earl of Elgin. It was also one of the earliest streets in Hong Kong.

Location
The street begins at a low elevation at Hollywood Road and ends high at Caine Road. The street is divided into two sections by the junction with Peel Street and Staunton Street. The upper section is less steep than the lower as it approaches the hilltop after the junction.

Features
One can find several stalls selling miscellaneous things, which are heaped on the ground, on the sloping street. Originally there were two dai pai dongs operating on the street near Hollywood Road, but one of them was forced to closed in 2005. Many international restaurants and a comedy club can be found on the upper section of the street.

Gallery

See also
 List of streets and roads in Hong Kong
 SoHo, Hong Kong

References

External links

Map of Elgin Street, Hong Kong
"The Muddy Elgin Street", Hong Kong Commercial Daily 

Central, Hong Kong
Roads on Hong Kong Island